Paracyrtophyllus is a genus of western true katydids in the family Tettigoniidae. There are at least two described species in the genus Paracyrtophyllus.

Species
These two species belong to the genus Paracyrtophyllus:
 Paracyrtophyllus excelsus (Rehn & Hebard, 1914) (chisos katydid)
 Paracyrtophyllus robustus Caudell, 1906 (truncated true katydid)

References

Further reading

 

Pseudophyllinae
Tettigoniidae genera
Articles created by Qbugbot